

List of Ambassadors

Marco Sermoneta 2015–present
Giora Becher 2014–2015
Yoed Magen 2011–2014
Meron Reuben 2007–2011
Yair Recanati 2003–2007
Ehud Eitam 2001–2003
Raphael Schutz 1999–2001
Avraham Haddad 1996–1999
Yaacov Deckel 1993–1996
Pinchas Avivi 1991–1993
Gideon Tadmor 1988–1991
Yaakov Gotal 1984–1988
Jaim Aron 1981–1984
Eliahu Barak 1978–1981
Shlomo Havilio 1974–1978
Victor Eliachar 1968–1974
Avigdor Shoham 1965–1968
Yaacov Yinon 1963–1965
Walter Abeles 1960–1963
Tuvia Arazi (Non-Resident, Lima) 1956–1960

References

Colombia
Israel